The Kaosikii or Kaos'ikii dance is a dance invented on September 6, 1978 by the Indian philosopher and social reformer Prabhat Ranjan Sarkar aka Shrii Shrii Anandamurti (1921–1990).

Sarkar claims the kaos'ikii dance is a psycho-physical exercise which would benefit the mind by developing mental stamina and strength. Some hints to this dance are also contained in the speech "The Cosmic Father Has a Special Responsibility" given in Madras (India) on December 4, 1978 and later published in "Ánanda Vacanámrtam Part 6, Chapter 5" and "Discourses on Tantra Volume Two, Chapter 23".

Etymology

“The name Kaoshikii comes from the Sanskrit word kosha, meaning “layer of mind”. Kaoshikii develops the subtler layers of mind, cultivating the feeling of mysticism – the endeavour to establish a link between the finite and the infinite – in one’s consciousness. It instils self-confidence and encourages self-expression."

See also 
 Ananda Marga
 Ananda Marga College
 Prabhat Ranjan Sarkar

References

Sources

External links 

 Kaoshikii: meanings and benefits
 
 Health and Kaosikii dance (Bengali) 
 Kaosikii nrtya
 Kaoshikii – The Dance of the Divine 

Asian dances
Spirituality
Tantra
1978 introductions
Prabhat Ranjan Sarkar
Sacred dance